Jolly is a city in Clay County, Texas, United States. It is part of the Wichita Falls, Texas Metropolitan Statistical Area. The population was 172 at the 2010 census.

Geography

Jolly is located at  (33.874304, –98.348556).

Demographics

As of the census of 2000, there were 188 people, 70 households, and 59 families residing in the city. The population density was 190.7 people per square mile (73.3/km2). There were 73 housing units at an average density of 74.1/sq mi (28.5/km2). The racial makeup of the city was 99.47% White, and 0.53% from two or more races.

There were 70 households, out of which 28.6% had children under the age of 18 living with them, 75.7% were married couples living together, 8.6% had a female householder with no husband present, and 14.3% were non-families. 12.9% of all households were made up of individuals, and 5.7% had someone living alone who was 65 years of age or older. The average household size was 2.69 and the average family size was 2.90.

In the city, the population was spread out, with 18.1% under the age of 18, 8.5% from 18 to 24, 27.7% from 25 to 44, 34.6% from 45 to 64, and 11.2% who were 65 years of age or older. The median age was 43 years. For every 100 females, there were 100.0 males. For every 100 females age 18 and over, there were 111.0 males.

The median income for a household in the city was $44,375, and the median income for a family was $49,375. Males had a median income of $29,375 versus $16,354 for females. The per capita income for the city was $20,467. None of the families and 1.7% of the population were living below the poverty line.

Education
The City of Jolly is served by the Henrietta Independent School District.

Notable people
Walter Jenkins, administrative assistant to Lyndon B. Johnson

References

Cities in Texas
Cities in Clay County, Texas
Wichita Falls metropolitan area